Catherine Ségurane (Catarina Ségurana in the Niçard dialect of Provençal) is a folk heroine of the city of Nice, France who is said to have played a decisive role in repelling the city's siege by Turkish invaders allied with Francis I, the siege of Nice, in the summer of 1543. 

At the time, Nice was part of Savoy, independent from France, and had no standing military to defend it. Most versions of the tale have Catherine Ségurane, a common washerwoman, leading the townspeople into battle. Legend has it that she knocked out a standard-bearer with her beater and took his flag.

Catherine's existence has never been definitively proven, and her heroic act is likely pure fiction or highly exaggerated; Jean Badat, a historian who stood witness to the siege, made no mention of her involvement in the defense. Historically attested defense of Nice include the townspeople's destruction of a key bridge and the arrival of an army mustered by a Charles III of Savoy. Nevertheless, the legend of Catherine Ségurane has excited the local imagination. Louis Andrioli wrote an epic poem about her in 1808, and a play dedicated to her story was written by Jean-Baptiste Toselli in 1878. In 1923, a bas-relief monument to Catherine was erected near the supposed location of her feat. 

In Nice, Catherine Segurane Day is celebrated annually, concurrent with St. Catherine's Day on 25 November.

References

  

Women in war in France
Women in 16th-century warfare
People of the Italian Wars